Diemenipatus is a genus of viviparous Tasmanian velvet worms in the family Peripatopsidae. All species in this genus have 15 pairs of legs in both sexes.

Species 
The genus contains the following species:

 Diemenipatus mesibovi Oliveira, Ruhberg, Rowell & Mayer, 2018
 Diemenipatus taiti Oliveira, Ruhberg, Rowell & Mayer, 2018

References 

Onychophorans of Australasia
Onychophoran genera